Selja may refer to the following:

People
Selja Kumari (born 1962), a member of the 15th Lok Sabha of India
Sirkka Selja (1920—2017), a Finnish poet and writer

Places

Estonia
 Selja, Hiiumaa Parish, village in Hiiumaa Parish, Hiiu County
 Selja, Lääne-Viru County, village in Viru-Nigula Parish, Lääne-Viru County
 Selja, Tori Parish, village in Tori Parish, Pärnu County
 Selja, Varbla Parish, village in Varbla Parish, Pärnu County
 Selja, Rapla County, village in Kehtna Parish, Rapla County
 Selja, Saare County, village in Leisi Parish, Saare County

Norway
 Selja, Selje, an island in Selje municipality, Norway; a former Catholic bishopric and now a Latin titular see as Selia

Sweden
 Selja, Sweden, a village area in Mora

Tunisia
 Selja Gorges, gorges in the Gafsa valley

See also
 Selje (disambiguation)